Wahlhausen is a village in the commune of Hosingen, in northern Luxembourg.  , the village has a population of 465.

References

Hosingen
Villages in Luxembourg